Hopedale Junior Senior High School is a public middle and high school located at 25 Adin Street in Hopedale, Massachusetts, United States.

It is part of the Hopedale Public School District, which includes three other schools.

Demographics 
The school enrolls 533 students. Statistically:

Gender 

 49% male
 51% female

Ethnicity 

 1% Native
 2% Asian
 1% Black
 2% Hispanic
 94% Caucasian

Education 

 13:1 student-teacher ratio
 70% of students participate in AP courses
 2% of students receive free or reduced lunch

Sports 
Hopedale athletes compete against schools within the Dual Valley Conference. Competitors include Douglas High School (Massachusetts), Sutton High School (Massachusetts), Blackstone-Millville Regional High School, Whitinsville Christian School and Nipmuc Regional High School. The school offers soccer, volleyball, track, basketball, lacrosse, softball, baseball, tennis, cheer-leading, cross country and golf.

See also 
List of high schools in Massachusetts

References 

Public middle schools in Massachusetts
Public high schools in Massachusetts
Schools in Worcester County, Massachusetts